Elin Cederroos (born 16 January 1985) is a Swedish professional boxer. She was a unified super-middleweight champion, having held the IBF female title from 2019 until April 2022 and the WBA female title from January 2020 until April 2022. As of May 2021, she is ranked as the world's best active female super-middleweight by The Ring.

Professional career
Before becoming a professional boxer, Cederroos played football professionally, doing so with Hammarby and Djurgården.

Cederroos made her professional debut on 8 April 2017, after her second pregnancy, defeating Sanja Ostojić by technical knockout in the fourth round.

With only five bouts in her career, on 22 March 2019, Cederroos fought Femke Hermans for the vacant IBF female super middleweight title. Cederroos won the bout by majority decision after ten rounds.

Professional boxing record

External links
Official website

References

1985 births
Living people
Super-middleweight boxers
Swedish women boxers
International Boxing Federation champions
Swedish women's footballers
Hammarby Fotboll (women) players
Djurgårdens IF Fotboll (women) players
Sweden women's youth international footballers
Women's association footballers not categorized by position